The following is a collection of lists of asteroids of the Solar System that are exceptional in some way, such as their size or orbit. For the purposes of this article, "asteroid" refers to minor planets out to the orbit of Neptune, and includes the dwarf planet 1 Ceres, the Jupiter trojans and the centaurs, but not trans-Neptunian objects (objects in the Kuiper belt, scattered disc or inner Oort cloud). For a complete list of minor planets in numerical order, see List of minor planets.

Background
Asteroids are given minor planet numbers, but not all minor planets are asteroids. Minor planet numbers are also given to objects of the Kuiper belt, which is similar to the asteroid belt but farther out (around 30–60 AU), whereas asteroids are mostly between 2–3 AU from the Sun and at the orbit of Jupiter 5 AU from the Sun. Also, comets are not typically included under minor planet numbers, and have their own naming conventions.

Asteroids are given a unique sequential identifying number once their orbit is precisely determined.

Physical characteristics

Largest by diameter 
Estimating the sizes of asteroids from observations is difficult due to their irregular shapes, varying albedo, and small angular diameter. Observations by the Very Large Telescope of most large asteroids were published 2019–2021.

The number of bodies grows rapidly as the size decreases. Based on IRAS data there are about 140 main-belt asteroids with a diameter greater than 120 km, which is approximately the transition point between surviving primordial asteroids and fragments of primordial asteroids. For a more complete list, see List of Solar System objects by size.

The inner asteroid belt (defined as the region interior to the 3:1 Kirkwood gap at 2.50 AU) has few large asteroids. Of those in the above list, only 4 Vesta, 19 Fortuna, 6 Hebe, 7 Iris and 9 Metis orbit there. (Sort table by mean distance.)

Most massive 

Below are the sixteen most-massive measured asteroids. Ceres, at a third the estimated mass of the asteroid belt, is half again as massive as the next fifteen put together. The masses of asteroids are estimated from perturbations they induce on the orbits of other asteroids, except for asteroids that have been visited by spacecraft or have an observable moon, where a direct mass calculation is possible. Different sets of astrometric observations lead to different mass determinations; the biggest problem is accounting for the aggregate perturbations caused by all of the smaller asteroids.

Outside the top four, the ranking of all the asteroids is uncertain, as there is a great deal of overlap among the estimates. 

Other large asteroids with masses measured from their moons are 107 Camilla and 130 Elektra.

For a more complete list, see List of Solar System objects by size. Other large asteroids such as 423 Diotima currently only have estimated masses.

Brightest from Earth 
Only Vesta is regularly bright enough to be seen with the naked eye. Under ideal viewing conditions with very dark skies, a keen eye might be able to also see Ceres, as well as Pallas and Iris at their rare perihelic oppositions. The following asteroids can all reach an apparent magnitude brighter than or equal to the +8.3 attained by Saturn's moon Titan at its brightest, which was discovered 145 years before the first asteroid was found owing to its closeness to the easily observed Saturn.

None of the asteroids in the outer part of the asteroid belt can ever attain this brightness. Even Hygiea and Interamnia rarely reach magnitudes of above 10.0. This is due to the different distributions of spectral types within different sections of the asteroid belt: the highest-albedo asteroids are all concentrated closer to the orbit of Mars, and much lower albedo C and D types are common in the outer belt.

Those asteroids with very high eccentricities will only reach their maximum magnitude rarely, when their perihelion is very close to a heliocentric conjunction with Earth, or (in the case of 99942 Apophis, and 367943 Duende) when the asteroid passes very close to Earth.

* Apophis will only achieve that brightness on April 13, 2029.  It typically has an apparent magnitude of 20–22.

Slowest rotators 

This list contains the slowest-rotating known minor planets with a period of at least 1000 hours, or 41 days, while most bodies have rotation periods between 2 and 20 hours. Also see Potentially slow rotators for minor planets with an insufficiently accurate period.

Fastest rotators 

This list contains the fastest-rotating minor planets with a period of less than 100 seconds, or 0.027 hours. Bodies with a highly uncertain period, having a quality of less than 2, are highlighted in dark-grey. The fastest rotating bodies are all unnumbered near-Earth objects (NEOs) with a diameter of less than 100 meters (see table).

Orbital characteristics

Retrograde 

Minor planets with orbital inclinations greater than 90° (the greatest possible is 180°) orbit in a retrograde direction. , of the near-800,000 minor planets known, there are only 99 known retrograde minor planets (0.01% of total minor planets known). In comparison, there are over 2,000 comets with retrograde orbits. This makes retrograde minor planets the rarest group of all. High-inclination asteroids are either Mars-crossers (possibly in the process of being ejected from the Solar System) or damocloids. Some of these are temporarily captured in retrograde resonance with the gas giants.

 the value given when the number of observations is multiplied by the observation arc; larger values are generally better than smaller values depending on residuals.

Highly inclined

Trojans 
 Mars trojans: , 5261 Eureka, and the candidate .
 Jupiter trojans: the first one was discovered in 1906, 588 Achilles, and the current total is over 6,000.

Record-setting close approaches to Earth

Viewed in detail

Spacecraft targets

Surface resolved by telescope or lightcurve 
 1 Ceres
 2 Pallas
 3 Juno
 4 Vesta
 5 Astraea
 6 Hebe
 7 Iris
 8 Flora
 9 Metis
 10 Hygiea
 Koronis family
 12 Victoria
 13 Egeria
 14 Irene
 15 Eunomia
 16 Psyche
 18 Melpomene
 26 Proserpina
 29 Amphitrite
 35 Leukothea
 37 Fides
 51 Nemausa
 52 Europa
 65 Cybele
 87 Sylvia
 89 Julia
 121 Hermione
 130 Elektra
 201 Penelope
 216 Kleopatra
 324 Bamberga
 511 Davida
 925 Alphonsina
 1140 Crimea
 9969 Braille
 (33342) 1998 WT24
 66391 Moshup
 (136617) 1994 CC
 (285263) 1998 QE2
 (357439) 2004 BL86

Multiple systems resolved by telescope 

 90 Antiope

Comet-like activity 

 2006 VW139
 P/2013 P5

Disintegration 
 6478 Gault
 P/2013 R3

Timeline

Landmark asteroids

Numbered minor planets that are also comets 

The above table lists only numbered asteroids that are also comets. Note there are several cases where a non-numbered minor planets turned out to be a comet, e.g. C/2001 OG108 (LONEOS), which was provisionally designated .

Minor planets that were misnamed and renamed 

In earlier times, before the modern numbering and naming rules were in effect, asteroids were sometimes given numbers and names before their orbits were precisely known. And in a few cases duplicate names were given to the same object (with modern use of computers to calculate and compare orbits with old recorded positions, this type of error no longer occurs). This led to a few cases where asteroids had to be renamed.

Landmark names 
Asteroids were originally named after female mythological figures. Over time the rules loosened.

First asteroid with non-Classical and non-Latinized name: 64 Angelina (in honor of a research station)

First asteroid with a non-feminine name: 139 Juewa (ambiguous) or 141 Lumen

First asteroid with a non-feminized man's name: 903 Nealley

Lowest-numbered unnamed asteroid:

Landmark numbers 
Many landmark numbers had specially chosen names for asteroids, and there was some debate about whether Pluto should have received number 10000, for example. This list includes some non-asteroids.

See also 

 Asteroid mining
 Asteroid Redirect Mission (proposed NASA mission)
 Centaur (small Solar System body)
 List of Aten asteroids
 Amor asteroid
 Apollo asteroid
 List of minor planets named after people
 List of minor planets named after places
 List of instrument-resolved minor planets
 Meteor air burst
 List of minor planet moons
 List of Venus-crossing minor planets
 List of Earth-crossing asteroids
 List of Jupiter-crossing minor planets
 List of Mars-crossing minor planets
 List of Mercury-crossing minor planets
 List of Neptune-crossing minor planets
 List of Saturn-crossing minor planets
 List of Solar System objects by size
 List of Uranus-crossing minor planets
 Lists of astronomical objects
 Scattered disc
 Small Solar System body
 ʻOumuamua

Books 
 Dictionary of Minor Planet Names, 5th ed.: Prepared on Behalf of Commission 20 Under the Auspices of the International Astronomical Union, Lutz D. Schmadel,

References

External links 
 Lists and plots: Minor Planets
 PDS Asteroid Data Archive
 SBN Small Bodies Data Archive
 NASA Near Earth Object Program
 Major News About Minor Objects
 Latest News About Asteroids & Meteorites

 
Exceptional asteroids